Thomas McKissock (April 17, 1790 – June 26, 1866) was a U.S. Representative from New York.

Born in Montgomery, New York, McKissock studied medicine and law.
He was admitted to the bar and commenced practice in Newburgh, New York.
He was appointed a puisne justice of the State supreme court in 1847.

McKissock was elected as a Whig to the Thirty-first Congress (March 4, 1849 – March 3, 1851).
He was an unsuccessful candidate for reelection in 1850 to the Thirty-second Congress.
He died in St. Andrews, Orange County, New York, June 26, 1866.
He was interred in Old Town Cemetery, Newburgh, New York.

Sources

1790 births
1866 deaths
Politicians from Newburgh, New York
Whig Party members of the United States House of Representatives from New York (state)
19th-century American politicians
People from Montgomery, New York